Großkmehlen is a municipality in the Oberspreewald-Lausitz district, in southern Brandenburg, Germany.

History
From 1815 to 1944, Großkmehlen was part of the Prussian Province of Saxony and from 1944 to 1945 of the Province of Halle-Merseburg. From 1952 to 1990, it was part of the Bezirk Cottbus of East Germany.

Demography

References

Populated places in Oberspreewald-Lausitz